Brighton Hall, formerly known as San Fernando Valley Professional School, is a private school educating students from second to twelfth grade in Burbank, California. It operates on a shortened daily schedule, accepts online coursework, and has rolling admissions in order to accommodate students with time-consuming professional or extracurricular commitments.

Notable alumni

Actors

 Isabella Acres
 Tucker Albrizzi
 Jason Bateman
 Jonathan Brandis
 Danielle Brisebois
 Noah Cyrus
 Zayne Emory
 Kaj-Erik Eriksen
 Soleil Moon Frye
 Emily Grace Reaves
 Madison De La Garza
 Frankie Jonas
 Olivia Rose Keegan
 Kira Kosarin
 Michael Eric Reid
 Patrick Labyorteaux
 Blake Lively
 Jason Lively
 Rio Mangini

 Indiana Massara
 Sierra McCormick
 Brittany Murphy
 Thomas Ian Nicholas
 Alfonso Ribeiro
 Britt Robertson
 Dylan Sprayberry
 Sydney Sweeney
 Kyla Kenedy

Athletes
 Lisa-Marie Allen
 Tai Babilonia
 Christopher Bowman

Musicians
 Janet Jackson

Other
 Annie LeBlanc

References

External links

High schools in Los Angeles County, California
High schools in the San Fernando Valley
High schools in Ventura County, California
Private high schools in California
Private middle schools in California
Private elementary schools in California